Paratriaenops furculus, also known as Trouessart's trident bat, is a species of bat in the family Hipposideridae. It is endemic to Madagascar. It was formerly assigned to the genus Triaenops, but is now placed in the separate genus Paratriaenops. A related species, Paratriaenops pauliani, occurs in the Seychelles.

References

Mammals described in 1906
Paratriaenops
Taxonomy articles created by Polbot
Taxa named by Édouard Louis Trouessart
Bats of Africa